Keith Carlton Fergus (born March 3, 1954) is an American professional golfer who has played on the PGA Tour, the Nationwide Tour and the Champions Tour.

Fergus was born in Temple, Texas. He started playing golf at age 8. In high school, he played football and basketball but enjoyed practicing golf more than the other sports. He attended and was a member of the golf team at the University of Houston, where he was a 3-time All American and runner-up to Jay Haas at the 1975 NCAA Championship. He turned pro in 1976.

Fergus had his best years on the PGA Tour in the early 1980s. During his PGA career, he had over 40 top-10 finishes and won three events. His best finish in a major was a T-3 at the 1980 U.S. Open; he also had a T-4 at the 1981 PGA Championship. He began using the long putter in 1988. Fergus took a break from the tour in 1988 when he accepted the head golf coaches job at his alma mater, the University of Houston, a position he held until 1994.

Fergus resumed tour play in the mid-1990s on both the Nationwide Tour and, on a limited basis, in PGA Tour events. In 1996, at the Nortel Open, he was attacked by a swarm of killer bees and was stung 10 to 15 times; his caddie was stung more than 50 times.

After turning 50 in March 2004, he began play on the Champions Tour. His first win was the 2007 Ginn Championship Hammock Beach Resort, where he became the second player to win on all the PGA Tour sponsored tours (PGA Tour, Nationwide Tour, and Champions Tour), the first being Ron Streck in 2005.

Fergus won the Cap Cana Championship in March 2009 where on Sunday, he shot a five-under-par 67 which included a dramatic holed out eagle 2 on the par 4 17th hole to give him the one stroke victory over Mark O'Meara and Andy Bean. It was his second Champions Tour win.

Fergus has done some course design work and starred in some television commercials. He lives in the Houston suburb of Sugar Land. In his spare time, he enjoys fishing.

Amateur wins (1)
1971 Texas State Junior

Professional wins (10)

PGA Tour wins (3)

PGA Tour playoff record (2–0)

Nike Tour wins (2)

Nike Tour playoff record (2–0)

Other wins (1)
1976 Texas State Open

Champions Tour wins (3)

*Note: The 2009 Regions Charity Classic was shortened to 36 holes due to rain.

Champions Tour playoff record (0–1)

Results in major championships

Note: Fergus never played in The Open Championship.

CUT = missed the half-way cut
"T" = tied

Summary

Most consecutive cuts made – 10 (1978 PGA – 1982 Masters)
Longest streak of top-10s – 1 (three times)

See also
Fall 1976 PGA Tour Qualifying School graduates
1994 PGA Tour Qualifying School graduates

References

External links

American male golfers
Houston Cougars men's golfers
PGA Tour golfers
PGA Tour Champions golfers
College golf coaches in the United States
Golfers from Texas
People from Temple, Texas
People from Sugar Land, Texas
1954 births
Living people